A D-ring is a D-shaped metal ring used primarily as a lashing point in a tie-down system. Depending on their function D-rings may vary in composition, geometry, weight, finish, and load capacity. They may be screwed or welded in place, or attached to the end of a cord or a strap.

In permanent applications recessed tie-down rings minimize obstruction when the ring is not in use.

A D-ring may be also used as a permanent lifting point, or as a part of a tether. The most basic carabiner is a D-ring with a pivoting gate.

References

Hardware (mechanical)